Hugh Waddell (13 November 1958 – 1 November 2019) was a Scottish professional rugby league footballer who played in the 1980s and 1990s as a  or . He played at representative level for Great Britain, England and Scotland, and at club level for Blackpool Borough, Oldham, Leeds, Manly-Warringah Sea Eagles, Sheffield Eagles, Swinton Lions, Wakefield Trinity, Rochdale Hornets, Carlisle, South Wales, and Barrow.

Waddell died on 1 November 2019, at the age of 60.

Background
Hugh Waddell was born on 13 November 1958 in Irvine, Ayrshire in Scotland. During his childhood, he moved south with his family to Burton upon Trent, Staffordshire in England. Waddell initially played football, and had trials with Leicester City before switching to rugby union to play for Burton RFC.

Rugby league career

Club career
In 1980, Waddell had trials with rugby league club Keighley, but was not offered a contract. In 1983, while on holiday in Blackpool, he asked for a trial at Blackpool Borough, and subsequently accepted an offer to sign for the club.

In January 1987, Waddell was signed by Oldham for a fee of £15,000.

Waddell joined Leeds in September 1988. He played in Leeds' 33–12 victory over Castleford in the 1988 Yorkshire Cup Final during the 1988–89 season at Elland Road, Leeds on Sunday 16 October 1988.

Waddell joined Sheffield Eagles in 1990, and went on to play for Swinton, Wakefield Trinity and Rochdale Hornets. In 1994, he joined Carlisle. He was briefly appointed as player-coach at the club following the departure of Cameron Bell, but was replaced as coach a few months later by Paul Charlton. He played for South Wales RLFC in 1996 before finishing his professional career with Barrow.

Representative career
Waddell made his international debut in 1984 while at Blackpool Borough, making his first (and only) appearance for England against Wales.

He debuted for Great Britain while at Oldham in 1988, playing in two matches against France. He was selected for the 1988 Great Britain Lions tour later that year, and was the only player from a Second Division club to be chosen in the squad. He played in two Test matches during the tour; the 26–12 victory against Australia in the 3rd Ashes Test, and the 10–12 defeat against New Zealand. He made one further appearance for Great Britain while at Leeds in 1989 against France.

Waddell also made four appearances for the newly-formed Scotland national team in 1995, including playing all three games for the team at the 1995 Emerging Nations Tournament.

References

External links
Statistics at orl-heritagetrust.org.uk 
(archived by web.archive.org) Statistics at stats.rleague.com
Rugby Union: Evans' professional call: Cardiff coaching organiser joins money debate
Scotland Rugby League International Honours Board
(archived by web.archive.org) Masters of Rugby League
Hugh Waddell, one of the heroes of Great Britain’s wonderful 1988 win in Sydney, spoke to me for Rugby League World’s ‘Blast from the Past’ section.

1958 births
2019 deaths
Barrow Raiders players
Blackpool Borough players
Carlisle RLFC coaches
Carlisle RLFC players
England national rugby league team players
Great Britain national rugby league team players
Leeds Rhinos players
Manly Warringah Sea Eagles players
Oldham R.L.F.C. players
Rochdale Hornets players
Rugby league players from Irvine, North Ayrshire
Rugby league props
Rugby league second-rows
Rugby union players from Irvine, North Ayrshire
Scotland national rugby league team captains
Scotland national rugby league team players
Scottish rugby league coaches
Scottish rugby league players
Scottish rugby union players
Sheffield Eagles (1984) players
Swinton Lions players
Wakefield Trinity players
South Wales RLFC (1995) players